Triton River most commonly refers to the Triton River in Boeotia and draining into Lake Copais.

It may also be:

Ancient Greece
 The modern Giophyros River in Crete

Ancient Libya
 Triton River (Libya), mentioned by Herodotus